Foxy or Foxxy may refer to:

People
 Foxy Brown (rapper) (born 1978), American rapper
 Foxy Brown (singer), Jamaican reggae singer
 Foxy Flumere (1912–1990), American football, basketball, and baseball coach
 Graeme Fowler (born 1957), English cricketer
 Adam Fox (ice hockey) (born 1998), American hockey player
 Neil Fox (broadcaster) (born 1961), British music personality
 Foxy Ntleki (born 1992), South African rugby union player
 John Fox (born 1979), part of British radio duo Foxy and Tom

Arts and entertainment

Fictional characters
Foxy (King of Fighters), from the King of Fighters video game series
Foxy (Merrie Melodies), a Warner Bros. character
Foxy (One Piece), from Eiichirō Oda's manga One Piece
Foxxy Cleopatra, a character in the movie Austin Powers in Goldmember
Foxxy Love, a character in the animated series Drawn Together
Foxy, a character from the Five Nights at Freddy's series
Foxy Brown, the title character of the 1974 blaxploitation film, Foxy Brown

Music
Foxy (band), an American Latin disco group

Other uses in arts and entertainment
Foxy (musical), a 1964 Broadway musical
Foxy (Pillow Pal), a toy made by Ty, Inc.

Other uses
5-Methoxy-diisopropyltryptamine, a psychedelic drug
Foxy (P2P), a peer-to-peer file sharing application for Microsoft Windows
 Foxy, a term used by wine connoisseurs to describe the aroma of grapes from Vitis labrusca

See also
Foxi (disambiguation)
Foxie, a 1983 album by Bob James 
"Foxy, Foxy", a 1974 song by Mott the Hoople
"Foxy Foxy", a 2006 song by Rob Zombie from his album Educated Horses

Lists of people by nickname